"Lose My Mind" is a song by Australian singer and songwriter Dean Lewis. Released in July 2017 as the third single from his debut extended play Same Kind of Different (2017).

Lewis explained: ""Lose My Mind" could be my favourite song on the EP, it's about how you feel when you are on the verge of losing someone and you feel like you can't live without them. It's like the first night without that person who has been there for you. I remember feeling like the walls were closing in cause that person who I could always turn to was gone. That felt like losing my mind."

In August 2017, "Lose My Mind" was used in a television promotion for the Seven Network's show 800 Words. "Lose My Mind" was ARIA certified platinum.

An acoustic version was released on 20 October 2017.

Track listing

Charts

Certifications

References

2017 singles
2016 songs
Dean Lewis songs
Universal Music Australia singles
Songs written by Dean Lewis